Port Nelson, as its name suggests, is the main port area of Nelson, New Zealand.

It lies to the northwest of Nelson city centre, to the north of Washington Valley, at the southern end of Nelson Haven. The harbour entrance lies at the southwestern end of Boulder Bank, immediately to the west of Port Nelson.

Geography

Port Nelson covers a land area of 0.98 km².

Nelson Marina, a marina owned by Nelson City Council, is located in the Port Nelson area.

The council also owns Custom House Reserve, a small area of public reserve around the port's custom house.

History

The estimated population of Port Nelson reached 40 in 1996.

It reached 90 in 2001, 99 in 2006, and 33 in 2018.

Demography

Port Nelson had a population of 33 at the 2018 New Zealand census, a decrease of 48 people (-59.3%) since the 2013 census, and a decrease of 66 people (-66.7%) since the 2006 census. There were 9 households. There were 21 males and 9 females, giving a sex ratio of 2.33 males per female. The median age was 45.5 years (compared with 37.4 years nationally), with 0 people (0.0%) aged under 15 years, 9 (27.3%) aged 15 to 29, 18 (54.5%) aged 30 to 64, and 6 (18.2%) aged 65 or older.

Ethnicities were 81.8% European/Pākehā, 18.2% Māori, 0.0% Pacific peoples, 0.0% Asian, and 0.0% other ethnicities (totals add to more than 100% since people could identify with multiple ethnicities).

The proportion of people born overseas was 36.4%, compared with 27.1% nationally.

Although some people objected to giving their religion, 54.5% had no religion, 36.4% were Christian and 9.1% had other religions.

Of those at least 15 years old, 3 (9.1%) people had a bachelor or higher degree, and 3 (9.1%) people had no formal qualifications. The median income was $24,300, compared with $31,800 nationally. The employment status of those at least 15 was that 21 (63.6%) people were employed full-time, 6 (18.2%) were part-time, and 0 (0.0%) were unemployed.

Transport

As of 2018, among those who commute to work, 44.4% drove a car, 11.1% rode in a car,11.1% use a bike, and 11.1% walk or run. No one took public transport.

References

External links
 

Nelson
Suburbs of Nelson, New Zealand
Populated places in the Nelson Region
Populated places around Tasman Bay / Te Tai-o-Aorere